Second-harmonic generation (SHG, also called frequency doubling) is a nonlinear optical process in which two photons with the same frequency interact with a nonlinear material, are "combined", and generate a new photon with twice the energy of the initial photons (equivalently, twice the frequency and half the wavelength), that conserves the coherence of the excitation. It is a special case of sum-frequency generation (2 photons), and more generally of harmonic generation.

The second-order nonlinear susceptibility of a medium characterizes its tendency to cause SHG. Second-harmonic generation, like other even-order nonlinear optical phenomena, is not allowed in media with inversion symmetry (in the leading electric dipole contribution). However, effects such as the Bloch–Siegert shift (oscillation), found when two-level systems are driven at Rabi frequencies comparable to their transition frequencies, will give rise to second harmonic generation in centro-symmetric systems.

 In addition, in non-centrosymmetric crystals belonging to crystallographic point group 432, the SHG is not possible  and under Kleinman's conditions SHG in 422 and 622 point groups should vanish although some exceptions exist.

In some cases, almost 100% of the light energy can be converted to the second harmonic frequency. These cases typically involve intense pulsed laser beams passing through large crystals, and careful alignment to obtain phase matching. In other cases, like second-harmonic imaging microscopy, only a tiny fraction of the light energy is converted to the second harmonic—but this light can nevertheless be detected with the help of optical filters.

Generating the second harmonic, often called frequency doubling, is also a process in radio communication; it was developed early in the 20th century, and has been used with frequencies in the megahertz range. It is a special case of frequency multiplication.

History

Second-harmonic generation was first demonstrated by Peter Franken, A. E. Hill, C. W. Peters, and G. Weinreich at the University of Michigan, Ann Arbor, in 1961. The demonstration was made possible by the invention of the laser, which created the required high intensity coherent light. They focused a ruby laser with a wavelength of 694 nm into a quartz sample. They sent the output light through a spectrometer, recording the spectrum on photographic paper, which indicated the production of light at 347 nm. Famously, when published in the journal Physical Review Letters, the copy editor mistook the dim spot (at 347 nm) on the photographic paper as a speck of dirt and removed it from the publication. The formulation of SHG was initially described by N. Bloembergen and P. S. Pershan at Harvard in 1962. In their extensive evaluation of Maxwell's equations at the planar interface between a linear and nonlinear medium, several rules for the interaction of light in non-linear mediums were elucidated.

Before the development of the first laser, Peter Franken made a $10 USD bet with his friend and colleague, Willis Lamb, that second-harmonic generation was possible. Lamb refused to believe such a development was possible. Upon the publication of Franken's results, he went to Lamb and demanded his payment. Lamb wrote him a check for $10 USD and Franken framed and hung it on his office wall, proudly showing it off to all visitors. Since his death, his wife Peg Nash Franken has maintained possession of the check.

Types in crystals

Critical phase-matching

Second-harmonic generation occurs in three types for critical phase-matching, denoted 0, I and II. In Type 0 SHG two photons having extraordinary polarization with respect to the crystal will combine to form a single photon with double the frequency/energy and extraordinary polarization. In Type I SHG two photons having ordinary polarization with respect to the crystal will combine to form one photon with double the frequency and extraordinary polarization. In Type II SHG, two photons having orthogonal polarizations will combine to form one photon with double the frequency and ordinary polarization. For a given crystal orientation, only one of these types of SHG occurs. In general to utilise Type 0 interactions a quasi-phase-matching crystal type will be required, for example periodically poled lithium niobate (PPLN).

Non-critical phase-matching

Since phase-matching process basically means to adapt the optical indices n at ω and 2ω, it can also be done by a temperature control in some birefringent crystals, because n changes with the temperature. For instance, LBO presents a perfect phase-matching at 25 °C for a SHG excited at 1200 or 1400 nm, but needs to be elevated at 200 °C for SHG with the usual laser line of 1064 nm. It is called "non-critical" because it does not depend on the crystal orientation as usual phase-matching.

Optical second-harmonic generation
Since media with inversion symmetry are forbidden from generating second-harmonic light via the leading-order electric dipole contribution (unlike third harmonic generation), surfaces and interfaces make interesting subjects for study with SHG. In fact, second-harmonic generation and sum frequency generation discriminate against signals from the bulk, implicitly labeling them as surface specific techniques. In 1982, T. F. Heinz and Y. R. Shen explicitly demonstrated for the first time that SHG could be used as a spectroscopic technique to probe molecular monolayers adsorbed to surfaces. Heinz and Shen adsorbed monolayers of laser dye rhodamine to a planar fused silica surface; the coated surface was then pumped by a nanosecond ultra-fast laser. SH light with characteristic spectra of the adsorbed molecule and its electronic transitions were measured as reflection from the surface and demonstrated a quadratic power dependence on the pump laser power.

In SHG spectroscopy, one focuses on measuring twice the incident frequency 2ω given an incoming electric field  in order to reveal information about a surface. Simply (for a more in-depth derivation see below), the induced second-harmonic dipole per unit volume, can be written as

 

where  is known as the nonlinear susceptibility tensor and is a characteristic to the materials at the interface of study. The generated  and corresponding  have been shown to reveal information about the orientation of molecules at a surface/interface, the interfacial analytical chemistry of surfaces, and chemical reactions at interfaces.

From planar surfaces

Early experiments in the field demonstrated second-harmonic generation from metal surfaces. Eventually, SHG was used to probe the air-water interface, allowing for detailed information about molecular orientation and ordering at one of the most ubiquitous of surfaces. It can be shown that the specific elements of :

 

Using an interference SHG method to determine these elements of χ(2), the first molecular orientation measurement showed that the hydroxyl group of phenol pointed downwards into the water at the air-water interface (as expected due to the potential of hydroxyl groups to form hydrogen bonds). Additionally SHG at planar surfaces has revealed differences in pKa and rotational motions of molecules at interfaces.

From non-planar surfaces

Second-harmonic light can also be generated from surfaces that are ‘locally’ planar, but may have inversion symmetry (centrosymmetric) on a larger scale. Specifically, recent theory has demonstrated that SHG from small spherical particles (micro- and nanometer scale) is allowed by proper treatment of Rayleigh scattering. At the surface of a small sphere, inversion symmetry is broken, allowing for SHG and other even order harmonics to occur.

For a colloidal system of microparticles at relatively low concentrations, the total SH signal , is given by:

 

where  is the SH electric field generated by the jth particle, and n the density of particles. The SH light generated from each particle is coherent, but adds incoherently to the SH light generated by others (as long as density is low enough). Thus, SH light is only generated from the interfaces of the spheres and their environment and is independent of particle-particle interactions. It has also been shown that the second-harmonic electric field  scales with the radius of the particle cubed, a3.

Besides spheres, other small particles like rods have been studied similarly by SHG. Both immobilized and colloidal systems of small particles can be investigated. Recent experiments using second-harmonic generation of non-planar systems include transport kinetics across living cell membranes and demonstrations of SHG in complex nanomaterials.

Radiation pattern

The SHG radiation pattern generated by an exciting Gaussian beam also has a (homogeneous) 2D Gaussian profile if the nonlinear medium being excited is homogeneous (A). However, if the exciting beam is positioned at an interface between opposite polarities (± boundary, B) that is parallel to the beam propagation (see figure), the SHG will be split into two lobes whose amplitudes have opposite sign, i.e. are  phase-shifted.

These boundaries can be found in the sarcomeres of muscles (protein = myosin), for instance. Note that we have considered here only the forward generation.

Moreover the SHG phase-matching can also result in : some SHG is also emitted in backward (epi direction). When the phase-matching is not fulfilled, as in biological tissues, the backward signal comes from a sufficiently high phase-mismatch which allow a small backward contribution to compensate for it. Unlike fluorescence, the spatial coherence of the process constrain it to emit only in those two directions, but the coherence length in backward is always way smaller than in forward, meaning there is always more forward than backward SHG signal.

The forward (F) to backward (B) ratio is dependent on the arrangement of the different dipoles (green in figure) that are being excited. With only one dipole ((a) in the figure), F = B, but F becomes higher than B when more dipoles are stacked along the propagation direction (b and c). However, the Gouy phase-shift of the Gaussian beam will imply a  phase-shift between the SHGs generated at the edges of the focal volume, and can thus result in destructive interferences (zero signal) if there are dipoles at these edges having the same orientation (case (d) in the figure).

Commercial uses
Second-harmonic generation is used by the laser industry to make green 532 nm lasers from a 1064 nm source. The 1064 nm light is fed through a bulk KDP crystal. In high-quality diode lasers the crystal is coated on the output side with an infrared filter to prevent leakage of intense 1064 nm or 808 nm infrared light into the beam. Both of these wavelengths are invisible and do not trigger the defensive "blink-reflex" reaction in the eye and can therefore be a special hazard to the human eyes. Furthermore, some laser safety eyewear intended for argon or other green lasers may filter out the green component (giving a false sense of safety), but transmit the infrared. Nevertheless, some "green laser pointer" products have become available on the market which omit the expensive infrared filter, often without warning. Second-harmonic generation is also used for measuring ultra short pulse width with autocorrelators.

Other applications

Ultra-short pulse measurement 
Characterizing an ultrashort pulse (like measuring its temporal width) cannot be done directly with electronics only, as the time-scale is below 1ps (sec) : it needs to use the pulse itself, that is why an autocorrelation function is often used. SHG has the advantage of mixing two input fields to generate the harmonic one, it is thus a good candidate (but not the only one) to perform such a pulse measurement. 
Optical autocorrelation, in its intensity or fringe-resolved (interferometric) version use SHG, unlike field autocorrelation. Also, most versions of the FROG (called SHG-FROG) use SHG to mix the delayed fields.

Second-harmonic generation microscopy

In biological and medical science, the effect of second-harmonic generation is used for high-resolution optical microscopy. Because of the non-zero second-harmonic coefficient, only non-centrosymmetric structures are capable of emitting SHG light.  One such structure is collagen, which is found in most load-bearing tissues. Using a short-pulse laser such as a femtosecond laser and a set of appropriate filters the excitation light can be easily separated from the emitted, frequency-doubled SHG signal. This allows for very high axial and lateral resolution comparable to that of confocal microscopy without having to use pinholes. SHG microscopy has been used for studies of the cornea and lamina cribrosa sclerae, both of which consist primarily of collagen. Second-harmonic generation can be produced by several non-centrosymmetric organic dyes; however, most of the organic dyes also generate collateral fluorescence along with second-harmonic generation signals. Until now, only two classes of organic dyes have been shown which do not produce any collateral fluorescence and works purely on second-harmonic generation. Recently, using two-photon excited fluorescence and second-harmonic generation-based microscopy, a group of Oxford University researchers showed that organic porphyrin-type molecules can have different transition dipole moments for two-photon fluorescence and second-harmonic generation, which are otherwise thought to occur from the same transition dipole moment.

Second-harmonic generation microscopy is also used in material science, for instance to characterize nanostructured materials.

Characterization of crystalline materials 
Second harmonic generation is also relevant to characterize organic or inorganic crystals since is one of the most discriminant and rapid technique to detect non-centrosymmetry. In addition, this technique can be used on single crystal as well as on powdered samples. One should recall that SHG is only possible (from the bulk) in non-centrosymmetric (NC) crystals. The part of non-centroysmmetric crystals in Nature is much lower than centrosymmetric crystals (circa 22% of the Cambridge structural database), but the frequency of NC crystals increases by a lot in pharmaceutical, biological and electronic fields because of the particular properties of these crystals (piezoelectricity, pyroelectricity, polar phases, chirality,...).

In 1968, (7 years after the first experimental evidence of SHG on single crystal), Kurtz and Perry started to develop a SHG analyzer to rapidly detect the presence or not of inversion center in powdered crystalline samples. The detection of a SHG signal has been shown to be reliable and sensitive test for the detection of crystalline non-centrosymmetry with the confidence level higher than 99%. It is a relevant tool to resolve space group ambiguities that can arise from Friedel’s Law in single-crystal X-ray diffraction. Furthermore, the method is referenced in the International Tables for Crystallography and is described as a “powerful method of testing crystalline materials for the absence of a symmetry center.

One possible application is also to rapidly discriminate chiral phases such as conglomerate that are of particular interest for pharmaceutical industries. It could also be used as a technique to probe the structural purity of material if one of the impurities is NC reaching a detection threshold as low as 1 ppm using Kurtz&Perry apparatus up to one part in 10 billion by volume using a SHG microscope.

Due to the high sensitivity of the technique, it can be a helpful tool in the accurate determination of phase diagram and can also be used to monitor phase transitions(polymorphic transition, dehydration, ...) when at least one of the phases is NC.

Theoretical derivation (plane wave)

At low conversion 
The simplest case for analysis of second-harmonic generation is a plane wave of amplitude E(ω) traveling in a nonlinear medium in the direction of its k vector. A polarization is generated at the second-harmonic frequency:

where  is the effective nonlinear optical coefficient which is dependent on specific components of  that are involved in this particular interaction. The wave equation at 2ω (assuming negligible loss and asserting the slowly varying envelope approximation) is

where .

At low conversion efficiency (E(2ω) ≪ E(ω)) the amplitude  remains essentially constant over the interaction length, . Then, with the boundary condition  we obtain

 

In terms of the optical intensity, this is,

 

This intensity is maximized for the phase-matched condition Δk = 0. If the process is not phase matched, the driving polarization at ω goes in and out of phase with generated wave E(2ω) and conversion oscillates as sin(Δkℓ/2). It does not pay to use a nonlinear crystal much longer than the coherence length. (Periodic poling and quasi-phase-matching provide another approach to this problem.)

With depletion

When the conversion to 2nd harmonic becomes significant it becomes necessary to include depletion of the fundamental. The energy conversion states that all the involved fields verify the Manley–Rowe relations. One then has the coupled equations:

 

where  denotes the complex conjugate. For simplicity, assume phase matched generation. Then, energy conservation requires that

 

where  is the complex conjugate of the other term, or

 

Now we solve the equations with the premise
 

and obtain
 

which leads to
 

Using
 

we get
 

If we assume a real , the relative phases for real harmonic growth must be such that . Then
 

or
 

where . From , it also follows that

Theoretical expression with Gaussian beams
The excitation wave is assumed to be a Gaussian beam, of amplitude:

Each wave verifies the wave equation

 

where .

With phase-matching 
It can be shown that:

(a Gaussian), is a solution of the equation (n = 2 for SHG).

No phase-matching 

A non-perfect phase-matching is a more realistic condition in practice, especially in biological samples. The paraxial approximation is however supposed still valid: , and in the harmonic expression,  is now .

In the special case of SHG (n = 2), in a medium of length L and a focus position , the intensity writes:

 

Thus, the SHG intensity quickly decays in the bulk, due to the Gouy phase-shift of the Gaussian beam.

In conformity with experiments, the SHG signal vanishes in the bulk (if the medium thickness is too large), and the SHG must be generated at the surface of the material: the conversion therefore does not strictly scales with the square of the number of scatterers, contrary to what the plane wave model indicates. Interestingly, the signal also vanishes in bulk for higher orders, like THG.

Materials used for second-harmonic generation 

Materials capable of generating a second harmonic are crystals without inversion symmetry. This eliminates water, cubic symmetry crystals and glass.

Here are some crystals used with certain types of laser for SHG conversion:

 Fundamental excitation at 600–1500 nm: BiBO (BiB3O6)
 Fundamental excitation at 570–4000 nm: Lithium iodate LiIO3.
 Fundamental excitation at 800–1100, often 860 or 980 nm: Potassium niobate KNbO3 
 Fundamental excitation at 410–2000 nm : BBO (β-BaB2O4)
 Fundamental excitation at 984 nm–3400 nm: KTP (KTiOPO4) or KTA,
 Fundamental excitation at 1 064 nm : monopotassium phosphate KDP (KH2PO4), lithium triborate (LiB3O5), CsLiB6O10 and Barium borate BBO(β-BaB2O4).
 Fundamental excitation at 1 319 nm : KNbO3, BBO (β-BaB2O4), monopotassium phosphate KDP (KH2PO4), LiIO3, LiNbO3, and potassium titanyl phosphate KTP (KTiOPO4).
 Fundamental excitation at ~1000–2000 nm : periodically-poled crystals, like PPLN.

Notably, filamentous biological proteins with a cylindrical symmetric such as collagen, tubulin or myosin, but also certain carbohydrates (such as starch or cellulose) are also quite good converters of SHG (fundamental in the near infrared).

See also
 Half-harmonic generation
 Nonlinear optics
 Optical frequency multiplier
 Second-harmonic imaging microscopy 
 Spontaneous parametric down-conversion
 Surface second harmonic generation
 Harmonic generation

References

External links

Articles

 
Second harmonic generation